Sqoop is a command-line interface application for transferring data between relational databases and Hadoop.

The Apache Sqoop project was retired in June 2021 and moved to the Apache Attic.

Description
Sqoop supports incremental loads of a single table or a free form SQL query as well as saved jobs which can be run multiple times to import updates made to a database since the last import. Imports can also be used to populate tables in Hive or HBase. Exports can be used to put data from Hadoop into a relational database. Sqoop got the name from "SQL-to-Hadoop".
Sqoop became a top-level Apache project in March 2012.

Informatica provides a Sqoop-based connector from version 10.1.
Pentaho provides open-source Sqoop based connector steps, Sqoop Import and Sqoop Export, in their ETL suite Pentaho Data Integration since version 4.5 of the software. Microsoft uses a Sqoop-based connector to help transfer data from Microsoft SQL Server databases to Hadoop.
Couchbase, Inc. also provides a Couchbase Server-Hadoop connector by means of Sqoop.

See also
Apache Hadoop
Apache Hive
Apache Accumulo
Apache HBase

References

Bibliography

External links

Sqoop Wiki
Sqoop Users Mailing List Archives

Apache Software Foundation projects
Cloud applications
Hadoop